Swinburne Island is a  artificial island in Lower New York Bay, east of Staten Island in New York City. It was used for quarantine of immigrants. Swinburne Island is the smaller of two nearby islands, the other being Hoffman Island to the north.

History
After several cholera pandemics in the nineteenth century, the federal government built Swinburne Island and Hoffman Island to serve as areas of quarantine for immigrants arriving by ship and carrying contagious diseases. Along with Hoffman Island, which was constructed in 1873, Swinburne was used through the early 20th century to quarantine immigrants to the United States who were found to be suffering dangerous contagious diseases upon arrival at the Port of New York.  Immigrants suspected of having such diseases were taken to the quarantine hospital and were not allowed to go to Ellis Island for entry until they were shown to be well or were cured of the disease. The island was used to quarantine patients during the last cholera outbreak in the United States in 1910–1911, which started with a passenger from Naples on the Moltke, a ship of the Hamburg-American line.  Swinburne was the second built, about a mile south of the earlier island, and it has a crematorium.  The island was originally called Dix Island, but was renamed in honor of Dr. John Swinburne (1820–1899), a military surgeon during the American Civil War.

During World War I, immigration was reduced. Later, the United States passed the Immigration Act of 1923, which sharply lessened immigration from southern and eastern Europe.  By this time, the city and state had learned other means of controlling infectious diseases, so the quarantine facilities were little used.

By the start of World War II, the United States Merchant Marine had adapted both islands as a training station, which had opened in 1938. It built additional quonset huts, which still stand.

Current use
Both Hoffman Island (11 acres) and Swinburne Island (4 acres) are now managed by the National Park Service as part of the Staten Island Unit of Gateway National Recreation Area. They are not open to the public.

Within the past decade, Swinburne Island has become a popular haul out site for Lower New York Harbor's population of harbor seals and grey seals. The populations of both species have been increasing every year.

References

External links 

 Harbor Herons Project, NYC Audubon
 Harbor Herons Nesting Survey -recent reports on wading bird, cormorant, and gull nesting activity at Swinburne Island
 A Satellite Photo of the two islands, Google Maps
 The Forgotten Of Ellis Island: Deaths in Quarantine, 1909–1911

Islands of New York City
Artificial islands of New York (state)
History of immigration to the United States
History of New York City
Protected areas of Staten Island
Islands of Staten Island
Gateway National Recreation Area
Nature reserves in New York (state)
Islands of New York (state)
Quarantine facilities in the United States